Fattoruso is an Italian surname. Notable persons with that surname include:

 Francisco Fattoruso (born 1979), Uruguayan musician born in Las Vegas
 Giuseppe Fattoruso, Italian painter of the Baroque period
 Hugo Fattoruso (born 1943), Uruguayan musician
 Osvaldo Fattoruso  (1948–2012), Uruguayan musician
 Rodolfo M. Fattoruso (born 1953), Uruguayan literary critic

Italian-language surnames